The Circuit de la Sarthe-Pays de la Loire is an early-season short road bicycle racing stage race held annually in Sarthe, Pays de la Loire, France. Since 2005, it has been organised as a 2.1 event on the UCI Europe Tour.

Between 1953 and 1974 it was an amateur race, becoming a professional race in 1975.

Winners

External links
  

 
UCI Europe Tour races
Cycle races in France
Recurring sporting events established in 1953
1953 establishments in France